The Battle of Erzurum occurred in 1821 as part of the Ottoman-Persian War of 1821–1823. The Persians, led by crown prince Abbas Mirza himself defeated their Ottoman arch-rivals near Erzurum.

The Persians were outnumbered with 30,000 men, led by Crown Prince Abbas Mirza, against the Turks with 52,000 men.

References

Sources

 Encyclopedia of the Modern Middle East, Volume 4, Page 301–302.

Erzurum
Erzurum 1821
Erzurum 1821
Erzurum 1821
1821 in the Ottoman Empire
1821 in Iran
History of Erzurum